"Wannabe in L.A." is the first single from the Eagles of Death Metal's third studio album Heart On. It reached number 38 on the Billboard Hot Modern Rock Tracks chart.

Hughes credits inspiration to the song on drummer Joey Castillo:

The song also references Alain Johannes and Natasha Shneider when Hughes says 'Alain and Natasha always make me say, I really wanna be in L.A."

The music video contains two versions directed by Liam Lynch. The Standard version is the original version and the Pins version uses CGI pins recreating images from the original music video.

The song is featured in the video game Midnight Club: Los Angeles which was released seven days before the song was released. It can also be heard in the video games Colin McRae: Dirt 2, MLB 09: The Show,  Shaun White Skateboarding, and is a playable selection in Guitar Hero 5. It also appears at the beginning of the film The Perfect Host.

Track listing
"Wannabe in L.A." - 2:15

References

External links
[ Allmusic.com]

2008 singles
Songs about California
Music videos directed by Liam Lynch
Eagles of Death Metal songs
Songs written by Josh Homme
2008 songs
Songs written by Jesse Hughes (musician)